The Scandinavian Enterprise Open was a golf tournament on the European Tour that was played in Sweden until 1990, when it had a prize fund of £400,000, which was mid-range for the tour at that time.

In 1991, the tournament was merged with fellow Sweden-based European Tour event, the PLM Open, with the resultant tournament being called the Scandinavian Masters.

Tournament highlights
1973: Bob Charles won the inaugural edition of the tournament; he finished two strokes ahead of Tony Jacklin, Hedley Muscroft, and Vin Baker.
1974: Jacklin won by 11 strokes over José María Cañizares despite a final round 75.
1977: Seve Ballesteros was struck by lightning on the 14th fairway during the second round of play. He escaped major injury and continued playing. Earlier in the same day Ballesteros got in a rules dispute when Lon Hinkle accused him of marking his ball incorrectly.
1980: Greg Norman returned a 64 in the final round to win by three strokes at Vasatorp
1983: Played for the first time at the newly created Ullna Course, designed by the tournament founder Sven Tumba, Sam Torrance won on the final hole over playing partner, American Craig Stadler.
1987: Magnus Persson's attempt to become the Scandinavian Enterprise Open's first Swedish winner was foiled when Gordon Brand Jnr defeated him on the first hole of a sudden-death playoff.
1988: Ballesteros won the Scandinavian Open for a third time; he finished five strokes ahead of Gerry Taylor.  
1990: Stadler returned a final round 61 to win the last edition of the tournament by four strokes over Craig Parry; it was his fourth appearance, after twice finishing as runner-up.

Winners

References

External links
Coverage on the European Tour's official site

Former European Tour events
Golf tournaments in Sweden